Awkley is a hamlet in the parish of Olveston in South Gloucestershire, England. It lies just off the M4 and M48 junctions. Several streams run in the area including Tockington Mill Rhine, Moor Rhine, Niatt Rhine and Sandy Rhine.
One notable building at Awkley is the former Ebenezer chapel, dated to 1850. Now known as "The Vine", it reopened for worship in August 2006.

A will dated 1632 showed that the hamlet (known as "Awklers"), was owned by a William Tovy, who held it in socage from the manor of Tockington. He left it to his son and heir, Edward Tovy.

References

External links 
Olveston Parish website

Villages in South Gloucestershire District